Vertical Communications, Inc. is a corporation that specializes in cloud and premises-based private branch exchanges, i.e., business telephone systems. Vertical Communications changed its name on January 1, 2005 from Artisoft, Inc. after acquiring Vertical Networks in September 2004.  In September 2005, Vertical Communications acquired Comdial.  On December 1, 2006, Vodavi Technology was acquired by Vertical Communications.

Products
Vertical offers new telecommunications products, as well as products from legacy product lines including:

As of 2018/2019, some of these are sold as refurbished units by equipment brokers.

Partner programs
Vertical sells almost exclusively through a value-added reseller (VAR) channel. Partners must meet certain minimum requirements to become a VAR, including purchasing a demo system and qualifying technical personnel by having them attend online training.

Artisoft
Tucson, Arizona-based Artisoft was the first company to offer peer-to-peer networking. The name of its network operating system was LANtastic.

In 1996 the company acquired  for $12.8 million. Stylus Innovation, noted for its Barcode-based remote shopping product, was founded in 1991 by Krisztina 'Z' Holly, Mike Cassidy and John Barrus. 

Stylus Innovation came to public attention by winning the Grand-Prize in the 1991 MIT $100K Entrepreneurship Competition.

Legacy
Artisoft bought TeleVantage, and renamed the latter Artisoft TeleVantage. However, with Microsoft's Windows for Workgroups "eating into" LANtastic's lead (as was Novell). and then free "bundled networking software" in Windows 95 and 98, the company "saw the handwriting on the wall."

LANtastic's originator, Artisoft Televantage, sold "Legacy" technology ("LANtastic")  to Spartacom Technologies in 2000. The latter, which subsequently was acquired by PC Micro, continued to market and maintain LANtastic. Version 8.01, released in 2006, can network PCs running MS-DOS (also PC DOS) 5.0 or later and Windows 3.x up to 7.

Vertical redirect
In September 2004 Artisoft, minus its former LANtastic technology, purchased Vertical and, effective January 2005, renamed itself
Vertical Communications Inc.

Vertical now had two non-competing main products, Televantage (for firms with under 1,000 phones and "one or more locations" and Vertical's "own" InstantOffice, "a Voice-over-IP phone system ... for large enterprises with many locations."

References

Companies traded over-the-counter in the United States
Telecommunications companies established in 1982
Telecommunications companies of the United States
1982 establishments in California